The Battle of Bargal occurred in June 2007 around the town of Bargal in the northern province of Bari, in the semi-autonomous region of Puntland.

Battle
On May 30, between 12 and 35 heavily armed Islamist fighters arrived in two fishing boats from southern Somalia and clashed with local troops. On June 1, a United States Navy warship, the USS Chafee, shelled hills around Bargal where Islamist militants were reported to have set up a base. The target of the shelling may have been an al-Qaeda operative who the United States believed was involved  in the 1998 bombings of US embassies in Kenya and Tanzania.

According to the Puntland regional government, as many as a dozen fighters including Somali militants as well as British nationals, Americans, Swedish, Pakistanis and Yemenis were killed in these operations, and five government troops were injured.

External links
BBC News: US attacks Somali 'militant base'
BBC News: 'Foreign fighters' die in Somalia
Yahoo! News: Report: U.S. hits militants' Somali base

Bargal 2007
2007 in Somalia
Bari, Somalia
Bargal (2007)
May 2007 events in Africa
June 2007 events in Africa
Bargal